Khaltabad-e Now Sazi (also Romanized as Khalţābād-e Now Sāzī; also known as Khalţābād and Khelt Ābād) is a village in Keybar Rural District, Jolgeh Zozan District, Khaf County, Razavi Khorasan Province, Iran. At the 2006 census, its population was 568, in 124 families.

References 

Populated places in Khaf County